A constitutional referendum was held in the United States Virgin Islands on 6 March 1979. Federal law passed by the United States Congress authorized the Virgin Islands and Guam to pass constitutions and form governments. A Constitutional Council had subsequently been elected in the 1977 general elections. The Council wrote and then unanimously adopted a draft constitution which provided for an elected governor and treasurer, a 17-seat Legislature, a local justice system and protections for Virgin Islander culture.

The draft constitution was rejected by the voters in the referendum.

Results

References

Referendums in the United States Virgin Islands
1979 in the United States Virgin Islands
1979 referendums
1979 elections in the Caribbean
Constitutional referendums